5-Methoxy-7,N,N-trimethyltryptamine (5-MeO-7,N,N-TMT, 5-MeO-7-TMT), is a tryptamine derivative which acts as an agonist at the 5-HT2 serotonin receptors. In animal tests, both 7,N,N-TMT and 5-MeO-7,N,N-TMT produced behavioural responses similar to those of psychedelic drugs such as DMT and 5-MeO-DMT, but compounds with larger 7-position substituents such as 7-ethyl-DMT and 7-bromo-DMT did not produce psychedelic-appropriate responding despite high 5-HT2 receptor binding affinity, suggesting these may be antagonists or weak partial agonists for the 5-HT2 receptors. The related compound 7-MeO-MiPT (cf. 5-MeO-MiPT) was also found to be inactive, suggesting that the 7-position has poor tolerance for bulky groups at this position, at least if agonist activity is desired.

See also
 5-MeO-2-TMT
 7F-5-MeO-MET

References 

Serotonin receptor agonists
Tryptamines
Phenol ethers